Nkambule is a surname. Notable people with the surname include: 

John Bheki Nkambule (born 1981), South African footballer
Phiwa Nkambule (born 1992), South African internet entrepreneur
Tibati Nkambule, Queen Regent and Indlovukati of Swaziland from 1889 until 1894